W32FB-D (channel 23) is a television station serving eastern Puerto Rico that is licensed to Ceiba. The station is owned by TV Red Puerto Rico. The station's transmitter is located at Interstate PR-982 between Fajardo and Ceiba.

External links

32FB-D
Low-power television stations in the United States